The Ajo Copper News is a weekly community newspaper serving western Pima County, Arizona.  It has been published since 1916 in Ajo, Arizona. Information about the newspaper, and some news briefs, can be found on its website at  www.cunews.info.

The newspaper concentrates on news of the community and also features columns by local writers. It accepts general advertising. It is sold at local newsstands and is also available by subscription.

The newspaper may be reached through its website which gives e-mail, mail, and telephone contact information.

History 

The first issue of the Ajo Copper News bore a dateline of April 29, 1916. In its history, the newspaper has had a handful of publishers and editors, moved a few times, come back from a disastrous fire, and survived some tough times.

Renwick White, encouraged by John Campbell Greenway and Mike Curley, founded the Ajo Copper News in March 1916 and published the first official issue in April. The first office was located in Clarkston and later was moved to Ajo.

Most of the newspaper files were destroyed when the newspaper office and a bakery burned down in 1935. A new building was built and the Ajo Copper News was published again after a hiatus of about three months.

White was editor & publisher of the Ajo Copper News for 31 years before retiring in June 1947.  L.T. “Ted” Beggs, who had been working for White, took over the paper. After Beggs’ death in November 1951, his wife Geraldine Beggs assumed the reins as publisher.

In 1954, George Gable became publisher with his son Barry acting as editor. After George Gable's sudden death from a heart attack in June 1958, Barry Gable became publisher and editor; his wife Lois joined him as business manager and later as assistant publisher.

Richard F. & Ann Hollister David bought the Ajo Copper News from the Gables in 1967 and served as publisher and editor respectively. When they retired in 1983, their son and daughter, Hollister J. “Hop” David and Gabrielle David, took over as publisher and editor. Dick David didn't enjoy a long retirement, he died in July 1983. Ann David died in July 1993 after a decade lost in the fog of Alzheimer's Disease. In 2008, Gabrielle David and Hop David were joined by their brother Joseph David, who had retired from a career in Alabama and returned to his newspaper roots.

In White's day, the newspaper was printed by the hot lead method. Type was set on a linotype using molten lead or by hand from cases full of individual letters. Illustrations for ads were poured using mats as molds. This continued for over fifty years, with the addition of an engraver for photographs, until Dick David bought electronic type-setting equipment that allowed the newspaper to be printed by the offset method. The equipment was updated, and a darkroom installed, carrying the newspaper into the 1980s when the Ajo Copper News finally entered the era of typesetting on computers. Some of the old type cases and a proof press can be seen at the Ajo Historical Society Museum.

When Dick & Ann David bought the newspaper, it was located on Pizal where a tiny park is now situated. They moved to 33 Plaza in the 1970s. The newspaper offices stayed there until October 1995 when Hop David and Gabrielle David purchased the building at 10 Pajaro where the newspaper offices are now located.

Most of this history appeared in the 90th anniversary issue of the Ajo Copper News in April 2006. Used with permission.

External links

Newspapers published in Arizona
1916 establishments in Arizona